Full House is an album by the jazz guitarist Wes Montgomery, released in 1962.

History
The performance was recorded live at Tsubo in Berkeley, California, on June 25, 1962.  The session featured a quintet that included Wynton Kelly on piano, Johnny Griffin on tenor saxophone, Paul Chambers on bass, and Jimmy Cobb on drums.

The album was released on the Riverside Records label. A 1987 CD reissue in the Original Jazz Classics series was followed by a later reissue in 2007 featuring additional bonus tracks.

Track listing

Original issue
 "Full House" (Wes Montgomery) – 9:14
 "I've Grown Accustomed to Her Face" (Alan Jay Lerner, Frederick Loewe) – 3:18
 "Blue 'n' Boogie" (Dizzy Gillespie, Frank Paparelli) – 9:31

 "Cariba" (Wes Montgomery) - 9:35
 "Come Rain or Come Shine" (Johnny Mercer, Harold Arlen) – 6:49
 "S.O.S." (Montgomery) – 4:57

1987 CD
"Full House" (Wes Montgomery) - 9:16
"I've Grown Accustomed to Her Face" (Lerner, Loewe) - 3:29
"Blue 'N' Boogie" (Gillespie, Paparelli) - 9:38
"Cariba" (Wes Montgomery) - 9:41
"Come Rain or Come Shine [Take 2]" (Arlen, Mercer) - 6:57
"Come Rain or Come Shine [Take 1]" (Arlen, Mercer) - 7:18
"S.O.S. (Take 3)" (Wes Montgomery) - 5:03
"S.O.S. (Take 2)" (Wes Montgomery) - 4:49
"Born to Be Blue" (Tormé, Wells) - 7:27

2007 reissue by Riverside
"Full House" (Wes Montgomery) - 9:16
"I've Grown Accustomed to Her Face" (Lerner, Loewe) - 3:29
"Blue 'N' Boogie" (Gillespie, Paparelli) - 9:38
"Cariba (Take 2)" (Wes Montgomery) - 9:41
"Come Rain or Come Shine [Take 2]" (Arlen, Mercer) - 6:57
"S.O.S. (Take 3)" (Wes Montgomery) - 5:03
"Cariba" (Wes Montgomery) - 8:28
"Come Rain or Come Shine" (Arlen, Mercer) - 7:21
"S.O.S." (Wes Montgomery) - 4:49
"Born to Be Blue" (Tormé, Wells) - 7:27
"Born to Be Blue (alternate take)" (Tormé, Wells) - 7:35

Personnel
 Wes Montgomery – guitar
 Johnny Griffin – tenor sax
 Wynton Kelly – piano
 Paul Chambers – bass
 Jimmy Cobb – drums

References

Wes Montgomery albums
Albums produced by Orrin Keepnews
1962 live albums
Riverside Records live albums
Original Jazz Classics live albums